Antonio Carlos Barbosa is a Brazilian basketball coach. He coached the Brazilian national team at the 2016 Summer Olympics, where the team finished eleventh.

References

Living people
Brazilian basketball coaches
Year of birth missing (living people)
Place of birth missing (living people)